The Taracahitic languages (occasionally called Taracahita or Taracahitan) form a putative branch of the Uto-Aztecan language family of Mexico.  The best known is Tarahumara.

Languages
Tarahumaran
Tarahumara
Guarijío (Huarijio, Varihio)
Tubar †
Cahita 
Yaqui
Mayo
Ópata †? (Eudeve, Heve, Dohema)

References 

Southern Uto-Aztecan languages